Isaac Asimov Presents The Great SF Stories 20 (1958) is the twentieth volume of Isaac Asimov Presents The Great SF Stories, which is a series of short story collections, edited by Isaac Asimov and Martin H. Greenberg, which attempts to list the great science fiction stories from the Golden Age of Science Fiction. They date the Golden Age as beginning in 1939 and lasting until 1963. This volume was originally published by DAW books in February 1990.

Stories 
 The Last of the Deliverers by Poul Anderson
 The Feeling of Power by Isaac Asimov
 Poor Little Warrior! by Brian W. Aldiss
 The Iron Chancellor by Robert Silverberg
 The Prize of Peril by Robert Sheckley
 Or All the Seas with Oysters by Avram Davidson
 Two Dooms by C. M. Kornbluth
 The Big Front Yard by Clifford D. Simak
 The Burning of the Brain by Cordwainer Smith
 The Yellow Pill by Rog Phillips
 Unhuman Sacrifice by Katherine MacLean
 The Immortals by James E. Gunn

Notes

20
1990 anthologies
DAW Books books
Martin H. Greenberg anthologies